A paramedic is a healthcare professional predominantly in the pre-hospital and out-of-hospital environment.

Paramedics or Paramedic may also refer to:

 Paramedics (U.S. TV series), a 1998 spin-off factual television series of Trauma: Life in the E.R.
 Paramedics (Australian TV series), a 2018 Australian factual television series
 "Paramedic!", a song from the soundtrack of the 2018 film Black Panther
 Paramedics (film), a 1988 comedy film

Other

 911 Paramedic , a video game released for PC. Published by Legacy Interactive.